Robert Jenkinson may refer to:

Robert Jenkinson (canoeist) (born 1960), New Zealand sprint canoer
Robert Jenkinson, 2nd Earl of Liverpool (1770–1828), Prime Minister of the United Kingdom
Sir Robert Jenkinson, 1st Baronet (1621–1677)
Sir Robert Jenkinson, 2nd Baronet (c. 1654–1710) of the Jenkinson baronets, MP for Oxfordshire
Sir Robert Jenkinson, 3rd Baronet (1685–1717) of the Jenkinson baronets, MP for Oxfordshire
Sir Robert Jenkinson, 5th Baronet (1720–1766) of the Jenkinson baronets